

A–L 

To find entries for A–L, use the table of contents above.

M 

 Ma – Yu Chuan Ma (born 1916)
 Maack – Richard Karlovich Maack (1825–1886)
 Maas – Paul Maas (born 1939)
 Maas Geest. – Rudolph Arnold Maas Geesteranus (1911–2003)
 M.A.Baker – Marc A. Baker (born 1952)
 Mabb. – David Mabberley (born 1948)
 Mabry – Tom J. Mabry (1932–2015)
 MacDan. – Laurence Howland MacDaniels (1888–1986)
MacDougal – Daniel Trembly MacDougal (1865–1958) 
 Macfarl. – John Muirhead Macfarlane (1855–1943)
 Machado – Othon Xavier de Brito Machado (1896–1951)
 Mack. – Kenneth Kent Mackenzie (1877–1934)
 Macklot – Heinrich Christian Macklot (1799–1832)
 MacLeay – William Sharp Macleay (fl. 1842)
 M.A.Clem. – Mark Alwin Clements (born 1949)
 MacMill. – Conway MacMillan (1867–1929)
 Maconochie – John Richard Maconochie (1941–1984)
 Macoun – John Macoun (1831–1920)
 MacOwan – Peter MacOwan (1830–1909)
 M.A.Curtis – Moses Ashley Curtis (1808–1872)
 Madani – Leopold Madani (fl. 1993)
 Madden – Edward Madden (1805–1856)
 Madenis – Claude Benoit Madenis (1798–1863)
 Madhus. – P. V. Madhusoodanam (born 1950)
 M.A.Diniz – Maria Adélia Diniz (born 1941)
 Madison – Michael T. Madison (born 1948)
 M.A.Dix – Margaret A. Dix (fl. 2000)
 Mädler – Karl Mädler (1902–2003)
 Madore – Lois Kay Madore (born 1948)
 Madrigal – Xavier Madrigal-Sánchez (born 1935)
 Madriñán – Santiago Madriñán (born 1964)
 Madsen – Jens E. Madsen (fl. 1989)
 M.A.Fenton – Mildred Adams Fenton (1899–1995)
 M.A.Fisch. – Manfred A. Fischer (born 1942)
 Maek. – Tokujirô(Tokijiro) Maekawa (born 1886)
 Mägd. – Karl Mägdefrau (1907–1999)
 Magill – Robert Earle Magill (born 1947)
 Magnin – Antoine Magnin (1848–1926)
 Magnol – Pierre Magnol (1638–1715)
 Magnus – Paul Wilhelm Magnus (1844–1914)
 Maguire – Bassett Maguire (1904–1991)
 Mai – Dieter Hans Mai (1934–2013)
 Maiden – Joseph Maiden (1859–1925)
 Maille – Alphonse Maille (1813–1865)
 Maingay – Alexander Carroll Maingay (1836–1869)
 Maire – René Maire (1878–1949)
 Maitul. – Yulia Konstantinovna Maitulina (born 1954)
 Makar. – Maria Florianivna Makarevich (1906–1989)
 Makino – Tomitaro Makino (1862–1957)
 Makinson – Robert Owen Makinson (born 1956) 
 Makowsky – Alexander Makowsky (1833–1908)
 Malaisse – François Malaisse (born 1934)
 M.A.Lane – Meredith A. Lane (born 1951)
 M.A.Lawson – Marmaduke Alexander Lawson (1840–1896)
 Malbr. – Alexandre François Malbranche (1818–1888)
 M.Allemão – Manoel Allemão (died 1863)
 Malm – Jacob von Malm (born 1901)
 Malme – Gustaf Oskar Andersson Malme (1864–1937)
 Malmgren – Anders Johan Malmgren (1834–1897)
 Maly – Joseph Karl Maly (1797–1866) 
 Manden. – Ida P. Mandenova (1907–1995)
 Mandon – Gilbert (Gustav) Mandon (1799–1866)
 Mani – Bince Mani (fl. 2015)
 Manik. – U. Manikandan (fl. 2001)
 Manilal – Kattungal Subramaniam Manilal (born 1938)
 M.A.N.Müll. – Michiel Adriaan Niklaas Müller (1948–1997)
 Mansf. – Rudolf Mansfeld (1901–1960)
 Manton – Irene Manton (1904–1988)
 Mappus – Marcus Mappus (1666–1736)
 Marais – Wessel Marais (1929–2013)
 Maranta – Bartolomeo Maranta (also as Bartholomaeus Marantha) (1500–1571)
 Maratti – Giovanni Francesco Maratti (1723–1777)
 Marc.-Berti – Luis Marcano-Berti (fl. 1967)
 Marcgr. – Georg Marcgrave (Marcgraf, Markgraf) (1610–1644)
 Marchal – Élie Marchal (1839–1923)
 Marchand – Nestor Léon Marchand (1833–1911)
 Marchesi – Eduardo Marchesi (born 1943)
 Marchoux – Émile Marchoux (1862–1943)
 Marcks – Brian Marcks (fl. 1974)
 Marg. – Hanna Bogna Margońska (born 1968)
 Margulis – Lynn Margulis (1938–2011)
 Marion – Antoine Fortuné Marion (1846–1900)
 Markgr. – Friedrich Markgraf (1897–1987)
 Markgr.-Dann. – Ingeborg Markgraf-Dannenberg (1911–1996)
 Markham – Clements Robert Markham (1830–1916)
 Marloth – Hermann Wilhelm Rudolf Marloth (1855–1931)
 Marnock – Robert Marnock (1800–1889)
 Marquand – Ernest David Marquand (1848–1918)
 Marquis – Alexandre Louis Marquis (1777–1828)
 Marrero Rodr. – Águedo Marrero Rodriguez (fl. 1988)
 Marriott – Neil R. Marriott (fl. 1993)
 Marroq. – Jorge S. Marroquín (born 1935)
 Marsh – Charles Dwight Marsh (1855–1932)
 Marshall – Humphry Marshall (1722–1801)
 Mart. – Carl Friedrich Philipp von Martius (1794–1868)
 Mart.-Azorín – Mario Martínez-Azorín (born 1979)
 Mart.Crov. – Raúl Martínez Crovetto (1921–1988)
 Martelli – Ugolino Martelli (1860–1934)
 Mårtensson – Olle Mårtensson (1915–1995)
 Mart.Flores – Fernando Martínez Flores (born 1979)
 Martín Bol. – Manuel Martín Bolaños (1897–c. 1970)
 Martín-Bravo – Santiago Martín-Bravo (born 1980)
 Martinelli – Gustavo Martinelli (born 1954)
 Martinet – Jean Baptiste Henri Martinet (born 1840)
 Martínez – Maximino Martínez (1888–1964)
 Martini – Alessandro Martini (born 1934)
 Martinoli – Giuseppe Martinoli (1911–1970)
 Martinov – Ivan Ivanovich Martynov (1771–1833?)
 Martinovský – Jan Otakar Martinovský (1903–1980)
 Martins – Charles Frédéric Martins (1806–1889)
 Mart.-Laborde – Juan Batista Martínez-Laborde (born 1955)
 Mart.Mart. – M. Martínez Martínez (1907–1936)
 Martos – Florent Martos (fl. 2015)
 Mart.Parras – José María Martinez Parras (born 1953)
 Martrin-Donos – Julien Victor de Martrin-Donos (1800–1870)
 Mart.Schmid – Martin Schmid (1969–2002)
 Martyn – Thomas M. Martyn (1736–1825)
 Masam. – Genkei Masamune (1899–1993)
 Masclef – Amédée Masclef (1858–1916)
 Maslin – Bruce R. Maslin (born 1946)
 Massart – Jean Massart (1865–1925)
 Massee – George Edward Massee (1845–1917)
 Masson – Francis Masson (1741–1805)
 Mast. – Maxwell Tylden Masters (1833–1907)
 Mateo – Gonzalo Mateo (born 1953)
 Mathias – Mildred Esther Mathias (1906–1995)
 Mathieu – Charles Marie Joseph Mathieu (1791–1873)
 Matr. – Alphonse Louis Paul Matruchot (1863–1921)
 Matsum. – Jinzō Matsumura (1856–1928)
 Matt. – Heinrich Gottfried von Mattuschka (1734–1779)
 Mattei – Giovanni Ettore Mattei (1865–1943)
 Matteri – Celina Maria Matteri (1943–2004)
 Mattf. – Johannes Mattfeld (1895–1951)
 Matthäs – Ursula Matthäs (born 1949)
 Matthei – Oscar R. Matthei (born 1935)
 Matthew – George Frederick Matthew (1837–1923)
 Matthews – Henry John Matthews (1859–1909)
 Matthiesen – Franz Matthiesen (1878–1914)
 Mattick – Wilhelm Fritz Mattick (1901–1984)
 Mattioli – Pietro (Pier) Andrea Gregorio Mattioli (Matthiolus) (1501–1577)
 Mattir. – Oreste Mattirolo (1856–1947)
 Mattos – Joáo Rodrigues de Mattos (born 1926)
 Mattox – Karl R. Mattox (born 1936)
 Matuda – Eizi Matuda (1894–1978)
 Maturb. – Rudi A. Maturbongs (fl. 2000)
 Maulder – Ricky G. Maulder (fl. 1995)
 Maund – Benjamin Maund (1790–1863)
 Maurizio – Adam M. Maurizio (1862–1941)
 Mavrodiev – Evgenij Vladimirovich Mavrodiev (fl. 1999)
 M.A.Wall – M. A. Wall (fl. 2007)
 Maxim. – Carl Maximowicz (1827–1891)
 Maxon – William Ralph Maxon (1877–1948)
 Maxwell – T.C.Maxwell (1822–1908)
 Maynard –  David J. Maynard (fl. 2008)
 M.Backlund – Maria Backlund (fl. 2007)
 M.Baker – Matthew L. Baker (fl. 2016)
 M.B.Bayer – Martin Bruce Bayer (born 1935)
 M.Bieb. – Friedrich August Marschall von Bieberstein (1768–1826)
 M.Blackw. – Meredith Blackwell (born 1940)
 M.B.Moss – Marion Beatrice Moss (born 1903)
 M.Broun – Maurice Broun (1906–1979)
 M.B.Schwarz – Marie Beatrice Schol-Schwarz (1898–1969)
 M.B.Scott – Munro Briggs Scott (1887–1917)
 M.B.Thomas – Mason Blanchard Thomas (1866–1912)
 M.B.Viswan. – M. B. Viswanathan (fl. 2000)
 M.B.Welch – Marcus Baldwin Welch (1895–1942)
 M.Caball. – Miguel Caballero Deloya (fl. 1969)
 McAll. – Hugh A. McAllister (fl. 1993)
 McCann – Yale Mervin Charles McCann (1899–1980)
 M.C.Chang – Mei Chen Chang (born 1933)
 McClell. – John McClelland (1805–1883)
 McClure – Floyd Alonzo McClure (1897–1970)
 McComb – Jennifer Anne McComb (born 1943)
 McCord – David Ross McCord (1844–1930)
 McCormick – Robert McCormick (1800–1890)
 McCoy – Frederick McCoy (1817–1899)
 McCraith – Gerald McCraith (1909–2009)
 McCune – Bruce Pettit McCune (born 1952)
 McDade – Lucinda A. McDade (born 1953)
 McDonald – William H. McDonald (1837–1902)
 M.C.E.Amaral – Maria do Carmo Estanislau do Amaral (fl. 1991)
 M.C.Ferguson – Margaret Clay Ferguson (1863–1951)
 McGill. – Donald McGillivray (1935–2012)
 McGregor – Ronald Leighton McGregor (1919–2012)
 M.Chandler – Marjorie Elizabeth Jane Chandler (1897–1983)
 M.Cheng – Mien Cheng (1899–1987)
 McIlv. – Charles McIlvaine (1840–1909)
 McIvor – William Graham McIvor (1824–1876)
 M.C.Johnst. – Marshall Conring Johnston (born 1930) 
 M.C.Pace – Matthew C. Pace (fl. 2017)
 McKie – Ernest Norman McKie (1882–1948)
 McKinney – Harold Hall McKinney (1889–1976)
 McLennan – Ethel Irene McLennan (1891–1983)
 M.C.Martínez – María Cristina Martínez (born 1974)
 McMillan – A.J.S. McMillan (fl. 1990)
 McNeill – John McNeill (born 1933)
 McQuoid – Nathan K. McQuoid (fl. 2002)
 McVaugh – Rogers McVaugh (1909–2009)
 M.D.Barrett – Matthew David Barrett (born 1974)
 M.D.Correa – Mireya D. Correa A. (born 1940)
 M.D.Ferrero – Michael D. Ferrero (born 1968)
 M.D.Hend. – Mayda Doris Henderson (1928–2015)
 Mears – James Austin Mears (born 1944)
 M.E.Collinson – Margaret E. Collinson (fl. 1980)
 Medik. – Friedrich Kasimir Medikus (1736–1808)
 Medlicott – Henry Benedict Medlicott (1829–1905)
 Meehan – Thomas Meehan (1826–1901)
 Meekiong – Kalu Meekiong (fl. 2005)
 Meenks – Jan L. D. Meenks (fl. 1985)
 Meerb. – Nicolaas Meerburgh (1734–1814)
 Meerow – Alan W. Meerow (born 1952)
 Meese – David Meese (1723–1770)
 Meeuwen – M. S. Knaap-van Meeuwen (born 1936)
 M.E.French – Malcolm E. French (fl. 2007)
 Mehrotra – Bishan N. Mehrotra (born 1936)
 Meier – Fred Campbell Meier (1893–1938)
 Meigen – Johann Wilhelm Meigen (1764–1845)
 Meijden –  (1945–2007)
 Meijer – Willem Meijer (1923–2003)
 Meijer Drees – E. Meijer Drees (fl. 1938)
 Meikle – Robert Desmond Meikle (born 1923)
 Meinecke –  (1721–1823)
 Meins – Claus Meins (1806–1873)
 Meinsh. – Karl Friedrich Meinshausen (1819–1899)
 Meisel – Max Meisel (1892–1969)
 Meisn. – Carl Daniel Friedrich Meissner (1800–1874)
 M.E.Jones – Marcus Eugene Jones (1852–1934)
 M.E.L.Archer – Mary Ellinor Lucy Archer (fl. 1917)
 Melch. – Hans Melchior (1894–1984)
 Melikyan – Aleksander Pavlovich Melikyan (1935–2008)
 Melvill – James Cosmo Mevill (1845–1929)
 Melville – Ronald Melville (1903–1985)
 Melvin – Lionel Melvin (1907–1997)
 M.E.Morales – María Eugenia Morales-Puentes,  (fl. 2008–2020)
 Menabde – Vladimir Levanovich Menabde (1898–1981)
 Menadue – Yvonne Menadue (fl. 1986)
 Mendel – Gregor Mendel (1822–1884)
 Mend.-Heuer – Ilse R. Mendoza-Heuer (born 1919)
 Mendonça – Francisco de Ascencão Mendonça (1889–1982)
 M.E.Newton – Martha Elizabeth Newton (1941–2020)
 Menezes – Carlos Azevedo de Menezes (1863–1928)
 Menge – Franz Anton Menge (1808–1880)
 Mennega – Alberta Maria Wilhelmina Mennega (born 1912)
 Mentz – August Mentz (1867–1944)
 Menyh. – László Menyhárth (1849–1897)
 Menzel – Paul Julius Menzel (1864–1927)
 Menzies – Archibald Menzies (1754–1842)
 Mérat – François Victor Mérat de Vaumartoise (1780–1851)
 Meredith – Louisa Anne Meredith (1812–1895)
 Mereles – Fátima Mereles (born 1953)
 Mereschk. – Konstantin Mereshkovski (1855–1921)
 Merkl. – Felix F. Merklinger (fl. 2017)
 Merr. – Elmer Drew Merrill (1876–1956)
 Merriam – Clinton Hart Merriam (1855–1942)
 Mert. – Franz Carl Mertens (1764–1831)
 Merxm. – Hermann Merxmüller (1920–1988)
 Mesfin – Mesfin Tadesse (born 1951)
 Mesnil – Félix Étienne Pierre Mesnil (1868–1938)
 Messina – Andre Messina (fl. 2010)
 Messmer – Pearl R. Messmer (fl. 1940s–1950s)
 Mett. – Georg Heinrich Mettenius (1823–1866)
 Metusala – Destario Metusala (fl. 2009)
 Metzg. – Johann Metzger (1789–1852)
 Mexia – Ynés Enriquetta Julietta Mexía (1870–1938)
 Mey.-Berth. – Brigitte Meyer-Berthaud (fl. 2001)
 Meyen – Franz Julius Ferdinand Meyen (1804–1840)
 Meyl. – Charles Meylan (1868–1941)
 Mez – Carl Christian Mez (1866–1944)
 M.F.Bourdon – M. F. Bourdon (fl. 2004)
 M.F.Fay – Michael Francis Fay (born 1960)
 M.Fleisch. – Max Fleischer (1861–1930)
 M.F.Newman – Mark Fleming Newman (born 1959)
 M.G.Brooks – Maurice Graham Brooks (1900–1993)
 M.G.Calder – Mary Gordon Calder (c. 1906–1992)
 M.G.Gilbert – Michael George Gilbert (born 1943)
 M.G.Henry – Mary Gibson Henry (1884–1967)
 M.Gómez – Manuel Gómez de la Maya y Jiménez (1867–1916)
 M.Gray – Max Gray (1929-2015)
 M.H.Alford – Mac Haverson Alford (born 1975)
 M.HeLi – Min Hui Li (fl. 2004)
 M.Hiroe – Minosuke Hiroe (1914–2000)
 M.H.Hoffm. – Matthias H. Hoffmann (fl. 1998)
 M.H.J.van der Meer – Maarten H.J. van der Meer (fl. 2019)
 M.Hopkins – Milton Hopkins (1906–1983)
 M.Hotta – Mitsuru Hotta (born 1937)
 M.Howe – Marshall Avery Howe (1867–1936)
 Micevski – Kiril Micevski (1926–2002)
 Michaelis – Peter Michaelis (1900–1975)
 Michelang. – Fabián Armando Michelangeli (born 1970)
 Micheli – Marc Micheli (1844–1902)
 Michelis – Friedrich Bernhard (Bernard) Ferdinand Michelis (1815–1886)
 Mich.Möller – Michael Möller (fl. 2009)
 Michon – Jean-Hippolyte Michon (1806–1881)
 Michx. – André Michaux (1746–1803)
 M.I.Dawson – Murray Ian Dawson (born 1962)
 Middend. – Alexander von Middendorff (1815–1894)
 Middled. – Harry Middleditch (born 1927)
 Miehe – Hugo Miehe (1875–1932)
 Miers – John Miers (1789–1879)
 Mig. – Emil Friedrich August Walter (Walther) Migula (1863–1938)
 Migo – Hisao Migo (1900–1985)
 Migush. – E. F. Migushova (born 1923)
 Mik – Josef (Joseph) Mik (1839–1900)
 Mikl.-Maclay – Nikolaj Nikolajewitsch Miklouho-Maclay (1846–1888)
 Mildbr. – Johannes Mildbraed (1879–1954)
 Milde – Carl August Julius Milde (1824–1871)
 Mill. – Philip Miller (1691–1771)
 Millais – John Guille Millais (1865–1931)
 Millardet – Pierre-Marie-Alexis Millardet (1838–1902)
 Millott – Jacqueline C. Millott (born 1981)
 Millsp. – Charles Frederick Millspaugh (1854–1923)
 Milne – Colin Milne (1743–1815)
 Milne-Edw. – Alphonse Milne-Edwards (1835–1900)
 Milne-Redh. – Edgar Wolston Bertram Handsley Milne-Redhead (1906–1996)
 Miq. – Friedrich Anton Wilhelm Miquel (1811–1871)
 Miranda –  (1905–1964)
 Mirb. – Charles-François Brisseau de Mirbel (1776–1854)
 Mirzoeva – Nina Vasilevna Mirzoeva (born in 1908)
 Mitch. – John Mitchell (1711–1768)
 Mitford – Algernon Bertram Freeman-Mitford, 1st Baron Redesdale (1837–1916)
 Mitt. – William Mitten (1819–1906)
 Miyabe – Kingo Miyabe (1860–1951)
 Miyake – Kiichi Miyake (1876–1964)
 Miyoshi – Manabu Miyoshi (1861–1939)
 Mizg. – Olga F. Mizgireva (born 1908)
 Mizut. – Masami Mizutani (born 1930)
 M.Jacobs –  (1929–1983)
 M.J.Reed – Merton J. Reed (fl. 1939)
 M.J.Roe – Margaret James Roe (fl. 1961)
 M.J.Turton – Margaret Joan Turton (born 1954)
 M.J.Wingf. – Michael John Wingfield (born 1954)
 M.J.Wynne – Michael James Wynne (born 1940)
 M.Kato – Masahiro Kato (born 1946)
 M.Knowles – Matilda Cullen Knowles (1864–1933)
 M.Kuhlm. – Moysés Kuhlmann (1906–1972)
 M.Lainz – Manuel Lainz (1923–)
 M.Lange – Knud Morten Lange (1919–2003) (son of Jakob Emanuel Lange)
 M.L.Bowerman – Mary Leolin Bowerman (1908–2005)
 M.Leon – Miguel de Leon (fl. 2015)
 M.L.Green – Mary Letitia Green (1886–1978)
 M.L.Williams – Mark L. Williams (fl. 2006)
 M.Martens – Martin Martens (1797–1863)
 M.M.Mart.Ort. – María Montserrat Martínez Ortega (born 1969)
 M.M.Mejía – Milciades Manuel Mejía (born 1952)
 M.N.Correa – Maevia Noemí Correa (1914–2005)
 M.Nee – Michael Nee (born 1947)
 M.Nishida – Makoto Nishida (1927–1998)
M.N.Philipson – Melva Noeline Philipson (1925–2015)
 M.N.Tamura – Minoru N. Tamura (fl. 1993)
 Moc. – José Mariano Mociño (1757–1820)
 M.O.Dillon – Michael O. Dillon (born 1947)
 Moeliono – B. Moeliono (fl. 1960)
 Moench – Conrad Moench (1744–1805)
 Moestrup – Øjvind Moestrup (born 1941)
 Moezel – P.G.van der Moezel (fl. 1987)
 Moffett – Rodney Oliver Moffett (born 1937)
 Mogea – J. P. Mogea (born 1947)
 Mogensen – Gert Steen Mogensen (born 1944)
 Moggr. – John Traherne Moggridge (1842–1874)
 Mohl – Hugo von Mohl (1805–1872)
 Mohlenbr. – Robert H. Mohlenbrock (born 1931)
 Möhring – Paul Heinrich Gerhard Möhring (1710–1792)
 Moir –  (1896–1985)
 Molau – Ulf Molau (born 1949)
 Moldenh. – Johann Jacob Paul Moldenhawer (1766–1827)
 Moldenke – Harold Norman Moldenke (1909–1996)
 Molina – Juan Ignacio Molina (1737–1829)
 Mollemans – Frans Hendricus Mollemans (fl. 1992)
 Molliard – Marin Molliard (1866–1944)
 Molloy – Brian Peter John Molloy (born 1930)
 Mols – Johan B. Mols (fl. 2000)
 Molyneux – William Mitchell Molyneux (born 1935)
 Momiy. – Yasuichi Momiyama (1904– 2000)
 Mönk. – Wilhelm Mönkemeyer (1862–1938)
 Monnard – Jean Pierre Monnard (born 1791)
 Mont. – Jean Pierre François Camille Montagne (1784–1866)
 Montgom. – Frederick Howard Montgomery (1902– 1978)
 Montin – Lars Jonasson Montin (1723–1785)
 Montrouz. – Jean Xavier Hyacinthe Montrouzier (1820–1897)
 Moon – Alexander Moon (died 1825)
 Moore – David Moore (1808–1879)
 Moq. – Christian Horace Bénédict Alfred Moquin-Tandon (1804–1863)
 Morales – Sebastiàn Alfredo de Morales (1823–1900)
 Moran – Reid Venable Moran (1916–2010)
 Morat – Philippe Morat (born 1937)
 Morawetz – Wilfried Morawetz (1951–2007)
 More – Alexander Goodman More (1830–1895)
 Moretti – Giuseppe L. Moretti (1782–1853)
 Morgan – Andrew Price Morgan (1836–1907)
 Moric. – Stefano Moricand  (1779–1854) (also known as Moïse Étienne Moricand)
 Morillo – Gilberto N. Morillo (born 1944)
 Moris – Giuseppe Giacinto Moris (1796–1869)
 Morison – Robert Morison (1620–1683)
 Moritz – Johann Wilhelm Karl Moritz (1797–1866)
 Moritzi – Alexander Moritzi (1806–1850)
 Morong – Thomas Morong (1827–1894)
 Morris – John Morris (1810–1886)
 Morrison – Alexander Morrison (1849–1913)
 Morrone – Osvaldo Morrone (1957–2011)
 Mort – Mark E. Mort (fl. 2014)
 Morton – Julius Sterling Morton (1832–1902)
 Moss – Charles Edward Moss (1870–1930)
 Mosyakin – Sergei Leonidovich Mosyakin (born 1961)
 Mot.Ito – Motomi Ito (born 1956)
 Motley – James Motley (1822–1859)
 Mottet – Séraphin Joseph Mottet (1861–1930)
 Motyka – Józef Motyka (1900–1984)
 Moug. – Jean-Baptiste Mougeot (1776–1858)
 Mouill. – Pierre Mouillefert (1845–1903)
 Mouterde – Paul Mouterde (1892–1972)
 M.Peck – Morton Eaton Peck (1871–1959)
 M.Prins – Marie Prins (born 1948)
 M.Proctor – Michael Charles Faraday Proctor (born 1929)
 M.Q.Liang – Liang Mingqing (fl. 1976)
 M.R.Almeida – Marselein Rusario Almeida (born 1939)
 M.R.Davis – M. R. Davis (fl. 1969)
 M.R.Hend. – Murray Ross Henderson (1899–1982)
 M.Roem. – Max Joseph Roemer (1791–1849)
 M.Roscoe – Margaret Roscoe (ca. 1786–1840)
 M.R.Schomb. – Moritz Richard Schomburgk (1811–1891)
 M.S.Baker – Milo Samuel Baker (1868–1961)
 M.S.Balakr. – Madura S. Balakrishnan (1917–1990)
 M.S.Br. – Margaret Sibella Brown (1866–1961)
 M.Schultze – Maximilian Johann Siegmund Schultze (1825–1874)
 M.Seq. – Miguel Pinto da Silva Menezes de Sequeira (born 1964)
 M.Serna – Marcela Serna (fl. 2009)
 M.Serrano – Miguel Serrano (fl. 2017)
 M.Serres – Pierre Marcel Toussaint de Serres de Mesplès (1783–1862)
 M.Simmonds – Monique S.J. Simmonds (fl. 2003)
 M.Sousa – Mario Sousa (born 1940)
 M.S.Tang – Mo Shih Tang (fl. 2013)
 M.S.Young – Mary Sophie Young (1872–1919)
 M.Taylor – Mary Ruth Fussel Jackson Taylor (born 1908)
 M.T.Lange – Morten Thomsen Lange (1824–1875)
 M.T.Martin – Margaret Trevena Martin (born 1905)
 M.T.Mathieson – Michael T. Mathieson (fl. 2010)
 M.T.Murillo – María Teresz Murillo (1929–2017) 
 M.T.Strong – Mark Tuthill Strong (born 1954)
 Mudd – William Mudd (1830–1879)
 Mudie – Robert Mudie (1777–1842)
 Muehlenbeck – Heinrich Gustav Muehlenbeck (1798–1845)
 Muehlenpf. – Philipp August Friedrich Mühlenpfordt (1803–1891)
 Muhl. – Gotthilf Heinrich Ernst Muhlenberg (1753–1815)
 Muirhead – Clara Winsome Muirhead (1915–1985)
 Müll.Arg. – Johannes Müller Argoviensis (1828–1896)
 Müll.Hal. – Johann Karl (Carl) August (Friedrich Wilhelm) Müller (1818–1899)
 Müll.-Thurg. – Hermann Müller (1850–1927)
 Munby – Giles Munby (1813–1876)
 Münchh. – Otto von Münchhausen (1716–1774)
 Mund – Johannes Ludwig Leopold Mund (1791–1831)
 Munn – Mancel Thornton Munn (1887–1956)
 Muñoz – Carlos Muñoz Pizarro (1913–1976)
 Munro – William Munro (1818–1880)
 Munz – Philip Alexander Munz (1892–1974)
 Murb. – Svante Samuel Murbeck (1859–1946)
 Murch. – Roderick Impey Murchison (1792–1871)
 Murdock – Andrew G. Murdock (fl. 2008)
 Murr – Josef Murr (1864–1932)
 Murray – Johan Andreas Murray (1740–1791)
 Muschl. – Reinhold Conrad Muschler (1882–1957)
 Mutis – José Celestino Bruno Mutis (1732–1808)
 M.V.Agab. – Mariam V. Agababjan (born 1964)
 M.Vahl – Martin Vahl II (1869–1946) (not to be confused with Vahl – Martin Vahl (1749–1804))
 M.V.Viswan. – M.Venkatesan Viswanathan) (born 1942-)
 M.Walcott – Mary Morris Vaux Walcott (1860–1940)
 M.Wallis – M. Wallis (fl. 1866)
 M.W.Chase – Mark Wayne Chase (born 1951)
 M.Williams – Margot Williams (fl. 1984)
 M.W.McDonald – Maurice W. McDonald (fl. 1996)
 M.Wolff – Manfred Wolff (born 1952)

N–Z 

To find entries for N–Z, use the table of contents above.

 

1